Izcopata (possibly from Quechua isku lime, pata step; bank of a river, "lime step (or bank)", also spelled Izcopata) is a mountain in the Cordillera Negra in the Andes of Peru which reaches a height of approximately . It is located in the Ancash Region, Recuay Province, Cotaparaco District. Izcopata is also the name of a place southeast of the mountain.

References 

Mountains of Peru
Mountains of Ancash Region